Bloody Roar, known as Bloody Roar: Hyper Beast Duel in Europe and Japan, is a fighting video game originally developed by Raizing (now Eighting) as an arcade game. It was later adapted for the PlayStation by Hudson Soft and published by Sony Computer Entertainment for the PlayStation. The arcade version was released on July 7, 1997 and was titled Beastorizer in North America. The PlayStation version was released in Japan on November 6, 1997, in North America (under the title Bloody Roar) on October 31, 1997 and in Europe in March 1998.

Bloody Roar is the first game in the Bloody Roar video game series and was followed by four sequels on multiple platforms. The game's story centers on a group of warriors known as "zoanthropes", who have the power to transform into half-human half-animal "Beasts", and the Tylon Corporation, an underground organization that seeks to use zoanthropes as mind-controlled weapons. The game received generally positive reviews from critics for its originality and graphics, while the audio received mixed opinions. The game's success resulted in its re-release for The Best range on October 14, 1999. The game was re-released on the PlayStation Network in North America on August 20, 2009.

Gameplay

At the beginning of each stage, both players have a set amount of energy that is used to activate "Beast form", which causes the character to change into a Beast. Players may transform at any time after the letter "B" appears in the "Beast Indicator" below the players' life energy indicators. The Beast Indicator appears blue when storing the energy needed for transforming. When the Beast Indicator is fully charged, the word "BEAST" appears, and the player can activate Beast form by pressing a certain button. During Beast form, the amount of fighting moves available to the character increases, the character becomes heavier, 3% of the character's life energy recovers and the character's jumping ability increases. While in Beast form, the Beast Indicator turns yellow. The yellow area decreases according to damage sustained by the character. The yellow area does not recharge during the current round. When the yellow area completely depletes, the Beast form will negate when the character is hit by an effective technique from the opponent.

Story and characters
 is a young wolf zoanthrope on a quest to uncover the circumstances of his father's death. His father, was a mercenary said to have died in combat in a South American country. Yūgo also seeks the mercenary Gadou, the sole survivor of Yūji's combat unit. Yūgo and Gadou eventually meet in a secret Tyron Corporation laboratory, where Gadou reveals that Yūji was a zoanthrope who fought against the Tyron Corporation's mind control experiments and conversion process. Yūgo then promises his father that he will destroy their enemies with the powers that he inherited from him.

 is a French lion zoanthrope, a professional mercenary and military genius who took part in a mission with his best friend and Yūgo's father, Yūji, years ago. On that day, his union of armies was crushed by a combined force of superior zoanthropes and a hostile army that appeared out of nowhere. Gadou was seriously injured in the battle and lost his sight in one eye. Afterward, he went off to search for Yūji and discover the identity of the enemy. At the end of the game, he destroys the Tyron Corporation, finally exacting revenge for Yūji. After Gadou's arrest, police discover the Tyron Corporation's secret lab and accumulate enough evidence against the Tyron Corporation to drop charges against Gadou. Afterward, desiring the thrill of battle, Gadou returns to the battlefield and promises Yūji that they will meet again in the heavens.

, real name  is a mole zoanthrope and a self-styled master of the traditional ninja arts. His personal details are veiled in secrecy and his existence is a mystery. An expert in assassination, he was enlisted in an infamous underground organization and put in charge of sabotage and the abduction of zoanthropes for experimentation. After the events of the story, Bakuryū's molecules destabilize, causing his body to completely decompose. As a result, the scientists of the Tyron Corporation decide to concentrate their efforts on a new conversion process.

 is a wild sow zoanthrope and everyday housewife with a massive body and generous nature. After her daughter (who is also a zoanthrope) was abducted, she went on a quest to find her, the only clue being the kidnapper's steely eyes and insanely sardonic grin. At the end of the game, she discovers her daughter Uriko and brings her home, where they lead a peaceful life.

 is a Chinese tiger zoanthrope who curses his fate and zoanthrope blood. When he was a child, his mother and younger sister died one after the other. Neglected by his workaholic father, Long ran away from his home. Afterward, his great skills in the martial arts and zoanthrope powers brought him recognition, and he was enlisted by an underground assassination unit. After the events of the story, Long seals himself away from the world due to his zoanthrope blood.

 is a rabbit zoanthrope who was kidnapped as a child by a secret research institution that conspired to use zoanthropes as weapons. After being subjected to physical experimentation, her latent powers were awakened, after which she was used as a test subject and given battle training. However, she managed to escape the institution before being brainwashed, earning herself the freedom she had long sought. While hiding herself to regain her composure, she began to worry about a girl that Alice befriended in the institution. Because the girl sacrificed herself by distracting Alice's pursuers during her escape, Alice decided to come out of hiding and fight against the institution. After the events of the story, Alice is adopted by her aunt Mitsuko and lives a peaceful life as a part of her family.

 ( for short) is an American gorilla zoanthrope who, in his youth, fulfilled his hope of running away to join a circus. Having a great talent for handling animals, he later took charge of the circus after the ringmaster retired. But with the rapid changes in the entertainment industry, the circus eventually went bankrupt and its members parted ways. After the events of the story, Greg tries to talk Yūgo into joining his circus and becoming their new star performer in an attempt to avert the circus's closure, but is eventually convinced into being the star himself.

 (nicknamed ) is an English fox zoanthrope with a warped mind and heightened aesthetic sense. He is obsessed with beauty and despises ugly things, boasting of his good looks and publicly declaring all else ugly. Abandoned as a child and raised in the slums, he grew up into a well-known scoundrel. He earned the nickname of Fox from his wariness and cruelty in beating up even the very weakest. He works for the Organization in the same unit as Bakuryū and engages in such activities as kidnapping and murder. After the events of the story, Fox kills another civilian, but is shocked to discover that it is his own mother.

Development
Bloody Roar was originally released as an arcade game titled Beastorizer in America, and was shown at the Electronic Entertainment Expo under the title. The visual design of the game was created by Mitsuakira Tatsuta (who also designed the characters of the game) and Shinsuke Yamakawa. The arcade soundtrack was composed by Atsuhiro Motoyama, Kenichi Koyano, Manabu Namiki, Hitoshi Sakimoto, Masaharu Iwata and Tomoko Miyagi, and published in 1997 by Wonder Spirits. The soundtrack of the PlayStation version was composed by Takayuki Negishi, who also would compose Bloody Roar 3. Bloody Roar was re-released on the PlayStation Network in North America on August 20, 2009.

Reception

Bloody Roar received generally positive reviews from critics, and its success resulted in its re-release for The Best range on October 14, 1999.

Sushi-X of Electronic Gaming Monthly said that the game's visuals "definitely look good, but to see these characters engage in flashy combat is even more impressive." Douglass Perry of IGN noted that the graphics had "great shadows" and "detailed textures in both the background and on the characters", but added that while the character design was "cool-looking", it was not "addictive or moving". Jeff Gerstmann of GameSpot stated that the game's graphics were "every bit as good as the arcade version".

Perry noted that the "high frame rates and a speedy graphic engine enable moves to be executed quickly and without wait." Gerstmann said that the game "runs fast and very smoothly" and that the game's moves are "very dynamic, resulting in a lot of oohs and aahs as a wolf bites a chunk out of his opponent's neck and blood spurts everywhere, splattering on the ground."

Perry admitted that he "actually [liked] half of the tunes, while half of them sound like they've been ripped off from forgettable '80s heavy metal tunes." On the voice acting, he noted that the only character sounds he found annoying were those from the character Alice, comparing her to both a "broken record" and Demonica from the Nintendo 64 video game Dark Rift. Gerstmann passed the music off as "typical fighting game fare", but said that the sound effects were "really great".

Next Generation reviewed the PlayStation version of the game, rating it four stars out of five, and stated that "Overall, Bloody Roar has solid gameplay and excellent graphics, even if it doesn't have any sense of style. And we'll take raw gameplay over style on any day."

Notes

References

External links

1997 video games
Arcade video games
Bloody Roar
Multiplayer and single-player video games
PlayStation (console) games
Sony Interactive Entertainment games
Video games developed in Japan
Video games scored by Atsuhiro Motoyama
Video games scored by Hitoshi Sakimoto
Video games scored by Manabu Namiki
Video games scored by Takayuki Negishi
3D fighting games
Hudson Soft games
Virgin Interactive games
Eighting games